The Delmar Formation is a geologic formation best exposed in seashore cliffs at Del Mar and Solana Beach in California, overlayed by Torrey Sandstone. The formation rocks comprise the barrier bar for Los Peñasquitos Lagoon and have three sub-facies that can be classified as ancient oyster reefs (Ostrea idrianensis), tidal flats and sublittoral channels and ponds The formation is a result of sedimentary infilling of a large Eocene Delmar lagoon and contains fossils from that period. First identified as "Delmar Sand" by Hanna in 1926. Frederiksen dates the formation as early Lutetian.

Appearance 
Delmar Formation consists of dark green claystone and mudstone, greenish-gray muddy sandstone, interbeds formed by biostromes of shells of molluscs.

Setting 
Frederiksen places the Delmar Formation and overlaying Torrey Sandstone above the Mount Soledad Formation and below Ardath Shale within the early Lutetian in calcareous nannofossils zone CP12.

The boundary between Delmar Formation and Torrey Sandstone is not clear-cut, the two facies intermix extensively, it is not unusual to find Delmar strata in between Torrey rocks.

The Delmar formation can be observed, together with Torrey Sandstone, for 20 kilometers along the seashore, from Encinitas to the Torrey Pines State Park, both extend up to 13 kilometers inland, and are expected to go to farther in the subsurface in the southwestern direction.

Fossils 
The formation contains microfossils (pollen, spores, etc.) and macrofossils (mollusc shells), with the latter indicating the brackish water conditions. Plant material can be also found in the form of remains of grass blades and wood fragments.

See also

 List of fossiliferous stratigraphic units in California
 Paleontology in California

References

Sources 
 
 
 
 
 
 
 

Geologic formations of California